Bodai is a Lebanese town in Baalbek District, Baalbek-Hermel Governorate, situated west of the Litani River in the foothills of Mount Lebanon. Bodai is located 15 km (9 miles) northwest of the ancient city of Baalbek and 26 km (16 miles) from the Lebanese–Syrian border and is 90 kilometers (55.926 mi) away from the capital of Beirut. Bodai, which sits in the foothills of the Mount Lebanon range, has views across the Beqaa Valley toward the city of Baalbek, and the Anti-Lebanon range that divides Lebanon from Syria.

History and etymology 

There is a possibility that the etymology of the town's present day name Bodai could be traced to the time of the French Crusaders' County of Tripoli within Mount Lebanon region and the possibility that the French Crusaders named the village or the area after the Maison Boudai, situated within Montbozon, a commune in the Haute-Saône department in the region of Franche-Comté in eastern France.

In 1838, Eli Smith noted Budey's population as being predominantly  Metawileh.

Population 
The main religions of the town are Shiites followed by Maronites and Eastern Orthodox Christians.

A significant percentage of the town population have migrated to the capital city of Beirut. Also, a significant percentage of the town population have migrated overseas to countries such as Brazil, Argentina, United States of America, Canada, Australia, Mexico, Gulf Arab states and European Union (UK and France). Migration figures are high to even suggest that every family in the town would at least have or know of one friend or relative that have migrated to another country.

Notable people 
Ali Hussein Nassif
Mohammad Yazbek
Mohammed Shamas

See also
Tell Aalaq
Flaoui
List of cities and towns in Lebanon
List of municipalities of Lebanon

References

Bibliography

External links
 Bouday - Aallaq Et Tell, Localiban

Populated places in Baalbek District
Shia Muslim communities in Lebanon
Maronite Christian communities in Lebanon
Eastern Orthodox Christian communities in Lebanon
World Heritage Sites in Lebanon
Archaeological sites in Lebanon
Great Rift Valley
Phoenician cities
Phoenician sites in Lebanon
Populated places established in the 7th millennium BC
Roman sites in Lebanon
7th-millennium BC establishments